Saviour Gama (born 10 May 1997), is an Indian professional footballer who plays as a defender for Goa in the Indian Super League.

Club career
Born in Goa, Gama represented FC Goa B. He was a part of the Goa developmental squad in 2017–18 and played for them in the local Goan matches, including the AWES tournament. Saviour earned a name in football after his impressive performance for the Santa Cruz Club of Cavelossim in the Taca Goa U-20.

Gama made his senior debut for Indian Super League side FC Goa against Chennaiyin FC on 28 February 2019. On 8 July 2019, Gama extended his stay with FC Goa until 2021.
 
He scored his first goal for Goa in Indian Super League Semi-final against Chennaiyin on 29 February 2020.

On 1 June 2021, Gama signed a new three-year contract with FC Goa, keeping him at the club until 2024.

Career statistics

Club

Honours
Goa
Durand Cup: 2021

References

1997 births
Living people
Footballers from Goa
Association football defenders
Indian Super League players
FC Goa players
Indian footballers